Gong Shengkai (born July 1956) is a Chinese materials scientist who is a professor at the School of Materials Science and Engineering, Beihang University.

Biography
Gong was born in July 1956. After graduating from Northeast Institute of Technology (now Northeastern University (China)), he earned his doctor's degree from Tokyo Institute of Technology in 1988. He carried out postdoctoral research at Tsinghua University in 1988. In 1994 he was offered a faculty position in the School of Materials Science and Engineering,  Beihang University.

Honours and awards
 2016 State Technological Invention Award (First Class)
 November 22, 2019 Member of the Chinese Academy of Engineering (CAE)

References

1957 births
Living people
Northeastern University (China) alumni
Tokyo Institute of Technology alumni
Beihang University alumni
Chinese materials scientists
Members of the Chinese Academy of Engineering